Fermín María Álvarez (1833–1898) was a Spanish composer. He concentrated mainly on salon songs, which were often performed along with zarzuela excerpts by other composers.

Works, editions and recordings

Opera and operetta
 Margarita, opera.
 El médico a palos, adaption of Le médecin malgré lui (opera) by Charles Gounod.

Orchestral
 Obertura capricho.

Salon songs
 Los ojos negros, canción de salón.
 No volverán, canción de salón.
 La partida, canción de salón, recordings by Enrico Caruso and Luigi Alva (Decca 1963) 
 A Granada, canción española
 and others

Media

References

1833 births
1898 deaths
People from Zaragoza
Spanish composers
Spanish male composers
19th-century composers
19th-century Spanish male musicians